is one of the eight wards of Niigata City, Niigata Prefecture, in the Hokuriku region of  Japan. , the ward had an estimated population of 76,086 in 29,843 households  and a population density of 800 persons per km².

Geography
Akiha-ku is located in an inland region of north-central Niigata Prefecture. Both the Agano River and the Shinano River flow through the ward.

Surrounding municipalities
Niigata Prefecture
Konan-ku, Niigata
Minami-ku, Niigata
Gosen
Agano
Tagami

Climate
Akiha-ku has a Humid climate (Köppen Cfa) characterized by warm, wet summers and cold winters with heavy snowfall.

History
The area of present-day Akiha-ku was part of ancient Echigo Province. The modern towns of Niitsu and Kosudo were established on April 1, 1889 within Nakakanbara District with the establishment of the municipalities system. Niitsu was raised to city status on January 1, 1951. The city of Niigata annexed Niitsu and Kosudo on March 21, 2005. Niigata became a government-designated city on April 1, 2007 and was divided into wards, with the new Akiha Ward consisting of the former city of Niitsu and former town of Kosudo.

Education

University
 Niigata University of Pharmacy and Applied Life Sciences

Primary and secondary education
Akiha-ku has 13 public elementary schools and six public middle schools operated by the Niigata city government. The ward has three public high schools operated by the Niigata Prefectural Board of Education.

Transportation

Railway
 JR East - Shin'etsu Main Line
 -  -  -  -  -  -
 JR East - Ban'etsu West Line
  -  -  -
 JR East - Uetsu Main Line

Highways

Points of interest
 Niigata Prefectural Botanical Garden
 Niitsu Railway Museum

References

Notes

External links

 Niigata city official website 
 Niigata Akiha-ku website 
 Niigata City Official Tourist Information (multilingual)
 Niigata Pref. Official Travel Guide (multilingual)

Wards of Niigata (city)